Only Things We Love is the fourth studio album by American electronica band Blaqk Audio, consisting of Davey Havok and Jade Puget of AFI. The album was released on March 15, 2019. Ahead of the album, the duo released "The Viles".

Background 
Havok said during an interview with Matt Pinfield that the band's next album would be out in spring of 2019 and that 69 songs were written to choose from. In January 2019, Davey Havok visited the KITS (ALT 105.3) studios to showcase the single "The Viles". While at the studio, Havok also confirmed the album's title, Only Things We Love.

In an interview with Sam Moore of NME, Havok revealed the album would be released on March 15, 2019.

Track listing

Personnel 
 Davey Havok – Lyrics and Vocals
 Jade Puget – Production, Recording and Engineering, All Music, Programming, Keyboards, Mixing and Mastering on "Dark Times at the Berlin Wall" and "OK, Alex"
 Eric Stenman  – Mixing
 Mike Bell at Darkart Mastering  – Mastering

Charts

References 

2019 albums
Blaqk Audio albums